Chen Wei (born October 1966) is a former Chinese politician who spent most of his career in East China's Shandong province. As of February 2015 he was under investigation by the Communist Party of China's anti-corruption agency. Previously he served as the Communist Party Secretary of Zaozhuang. He is now the executive director of China Jingyi Group and chairman of Zhejiang Huajingtong Tourism Development Co., Ltd..

Chinese media reported that Chen Wei had close relations with Gu Liping, wife of Ling Jihua, former vice chairman of the National Chinese People's Political Consultative Conference (CPPCC) and the head of the United Front Work Department of the Communist Party Central Committee.

Life and career
Chen Wei was born and raised in Jinhua, Zhejiang. He entered PLA Information Engineering University in September 1984, majoring in information system at the College of Electronic Technology, where he graduated in July 1988. Then he was a postgraduate student at Harbin Engineering University from August 1988 to August 1990, and from September 1990-September 1993 doctoral student at East China University of Science and Technology. He then went to Japan for four years to study economic management. He remained in Japan, becoming a chief engineer at Omron Corporation in April 1997.

Chen returned to China in 2000, he was the assistant mayor in Weihai in December 2000, and vice-mayor, in January 2002.

In September 2002, he was appointed secretary and party branch secretary of Shandong Provincial Committee of the Communist Youth League, he remained in that position until September 2006, when he was transferred to Zaozhuang and appointed deputy Communist Party secretary and mayor. He was Communist Party Secretary, the top political position in the city, from December 2011 to February 2015.

Downfall
On February 28, 2015, the state media reported that he was placed under investigation by the Communist Party's anti-corruption agency. Then he was dismissed for corruption. On July 8, he was expelled from the Communist Party of China (CPC) and was downgraded to section director level of non leadership position.

References

1966 births
Living people
Political office-holders in Shandong
PLA Information Engineering University alumni
Harbin Engineering University alumni
East China University of Science and Technology alumni
Tokyo Institute of Technology alumni
Businesspeople from Jinhua